Hjorte Apotek was a pharmacy located at Gothersgade 35 in central Copenhagen, Denmark. It opened in 1800 and closed in 1967. The building was listed on the Danish registry of protected buildings and places in 1964.

History

18th century
The property was in the late 17th century part of a larger property. It was by 1689 as No. 183 owned by the widow of Hans Ribeth. The site was by 1756 as No. 138 one monsieur Schielderup,

At the time of the 1787 census, No. 138 was home to two households. Alexander Kølpin (1731-1801), a professor at the Royal Academy of Surgery, resided in the building with his housekeeper Anne Sotmann, the surgery amanuensis Johan Heinrich Christian Feldtman, the military surgeon Johan Friedrich Feldtman	, a maid, a coachman and a caretaker. Jacob Friedrich Schlaffer, a tea merchant, resided in the building with his wife Elisabeth Magdalene NN, their nine-year-old foster son Peter Hofman, the maid 	Kirstine Jacobsdatter	 and the 71-year-old lodger Melchior Johan von Witten.

The pharmacy, 18001967
On 27 December 1799, Nicolaj Tychsen (1751-804) was granted a royal license to open a pharmacy on Gothersgade in Copenhagen. His new building at No. 35 was not completed until 1801 but the pharmacy already opened in 1800.

At the time of the 1801 census, No. 138 was again  listed as the home of Jølpin's housekeeper Anne Sotman, the chamber maid  Helene Dorthe Arps, the lodger Ellen Samueline Grønlund, the surgeon's apprentice Hans Flor and one maid.

Tychsen's widow Anna Sørine Henrikke née Hollensen continued the operations after his death in 1804. She passed it on to their son Johan Lorentz Tychsen in 1817.

Constantin Johan Glahn was the owner from 5 April 1842 to 31 December 1849. At the time of the 1845 census, No. 336B was home to a total of 17 residents. Constantin Johan Glahn resided on the two lower floors (ground floor and first floor) with his wife 	 Erasmine Glahm (née Myhre(three assistants, two apprentices, a male servant and two maids. Lauritz Peter Holmblad, a 30-year-old manufacturer, was also living on the first floor with his six year old son. His brother Andreas Holmblad, a jurist, resided on the second floor with a maid. Maria Helene Elisabeth Erichson (née Raupach), widow of	Christian Gotfred Erichson (1682-1842), who had served as royal bookkeeper on Saint Croix, was also residing on the second floor with her daughter Atalnte Caroline Angeligne Erichson	 and one maid.

 
The next owner was Harald Alfred Fedor Piper (9 June 1823 - 1 April 1900). In 1884 he opassed it on to his son Harald Georg Vilhelm Piper. He owned it until 1924. Kjeld Ove Frandsen was the owner from 1924 to 1930. Henry Edgar Tegner then owned it until its closure on 30 June 1967.

Architecture
 
The building is three storeys tall and five bays wide. Over the main entrance is a gilded sculpture of a lying deer, a reference to the name of the pharmacy ("Deer Pharmacy"").

Today
A bar is now based in the ground floor.

List of pharmacists
 27 December 1799 - 8 August 1804 Nicolai Tychsen
 8 August 1804 - 31 December 1817 Anna Sørine Henrikke f.Hollensen Enke
 28.11.1817 - 18.11.1841 Johan Lorentz Tychsen
 5 April 1842 - 31 March 1849 Constantin Johan Glahn
 20 April 1849 - 31 October 1889 Harald Alfred Fedor Piper
 9 December 1889 - 28 December 1924 Harald Georg Vilhelm Piper
 27 March 1925 - 30 June 1930 Kjeld Ove Frandsen
 * 28 April 1930 - 30 June 1967 Henry Edgar Tegner

References

External links

Pharmacies in Copenhagen
Listed pharmacy buildings in Denmark
Danish companies established in 1799
Retail companies established in 1799
Listed buildings and structures in Copenhagen
1967 disestablishments in Denmark